Feniseca tarquinius, the harvester, is a butterfly of the family Lycaenidae, and the only member of the monotypic genus Feniseca. It is found in eastern North America.

This butterfly is the only carnivorous (i.e., insectivorous) butterfly in North America (there are a handful of carnivorous  moths, for example Fulgoraecia exigua). The larvae feed on various aphids, such as Neoprociphilus, Pemphigus, Prociphilus, and Schizoneura.

It is found in early spring until fall and is generally scarce. It lives in wooded areas near streams close to alders.

The wingspan is 23–32 mm.

Another butterfly which is possibly carnivorous is Celastrina serotina. It feeds on galls on  black cherry and possibly also on the eriophid mites that make the galls.

References

External links
Harvester, Butterflies and Moths of North America
Feniseca at Markku Savela's website on Lepidoptera
 Bugguide.net. Species Feniseca tarquinius - Harvester - Hodges#4249

Miletinae
Butterflies of North America
Taxa named by Augustus Radcliffe Grote
Monotypic butterfly genera
Lycaenidae genera